Goldsmith Glacier is a glacier flowing west-northwest through the Theron Mountains of Antarctica,  south of Tailend Nunatak. It was first mapped in 1956–57 by the Commonwealth Trans-Antarctic Expedition (CTAE) and named for Rainer Goldsmith, medical officer with the advance party of the CTAE in 1955–56.

See also
 List of glaciers in the Antarctic
 Glaciology

References

Glaciers of Coats Land